Schieder is a German surname which may refer to:
 Andreas Schieder (born 1969), Austrian politician
 Illo Schieder, German musician and Eurovision contestant
 Marianne Schieder (born 1962), German politician
 Stefaan Schieder, German film producer
 Schieder-Schwalenberg, a town in North Rhine-Westphalia, Germany